Rikki-Lee Rimmington (born 22 June 1985) is a former Australian cricketer. A right-arm fast-medium bowler, she represented Queensland in 34 List A matches in the Women's National Cricket League (WNCL) between the 2003–04 and 2007–08 seasons.

Rimmington was born in Redcliffe, Queensland. Her older brother Nathan is also a cricketer.

References

External links
 

1985 births
Living people
Australian cricketers
Australian women cricketers
Cricketers from Queensland
Sportswomen from Queensland
Queensland Fire cricketers